The Battle of Bila Tserkva was fought on 24–25 September 1651 near the city of Bila Tserkva as part of the Khmelnytsky Uprising. It was fought between the Zaporozhian Cossack Army and their Tatar allies and the Polish–Lithuanian Commonwealth.

Setting
Following the Battle of Berestechko, under orders from the departing king, the Polish army under Potocki advanced into the Ukraine, reaching Liubar on 4 August, the same time Prince Janusz Radziwiłł's forces entered Kiev.  Potocki's forces soon encountered Cossack positions near Bila Tserkva, and Khmelnytsky's main camp to the east, preventing the Crown and Lithuanian forces from uniting.  The death of Prince Jeremi Wisniowiecki, "the prince who constantly insisted on the most energetic and ruthless tactics possible against Cossackdom", delayed movement of the Crown army until 23 August, when it moved "to the vicinity of Trylisy", taking the garrison of 600 Cossacks the next day.  On 3 Sept., Radziwill "agreed to merge" his Lithuanian army "with the Polish army near Vasylkiv", and "took up a position with it near Hermanivka" on 13 September, followed by "the entire camp" being moved "toward Bila Tserkva" on 16 September.  After peace negotiations all month failed to progress, the "Polish Hetmans moved – probably on 22 September [N.S.]- in a defensive formation from the area of Hermanivka..to the vicinity of Bila Tserkva", the Crown army at the centre and right flank, the Lithuanian army on the left.

Battle
According to Potocki, who was commanding from the centre with Zygmunt Przyjemski, "Thus on 23 September [N.S.] I was approaching Bila Tserkva.  A good mile ahead, Cossack and Tatar horseman came out to engage us, and I moved against them in a formation similar to that at Berestechko, adhering to the information given by His Royal Majesty, and attacked the enemy in a broad line.  I committed the right flank to Prince Janusz Radzwiłł, and the left flank to the Palatine of Chernihiv, Marcin Kalinowski, together with the Palatine of Podolia, Stanisław "Rewera" Potocki.  He "ordered the vanguard regiment..into battle" and "drove the enemy right into their camp, littering the field abundantly with Cossack and Tatar corpses."

"On Sunday, 24 September, the "Cossacks were building a rampart near a dike" and Potocki "ordered our army to go into the field...our skirmishers fought against the Tatars" and "the Cossacks withdrew to the marshes".

"On the 25th", according to Potocki, "the Cossacks moved into the field, with Tatars, and so did our army" and "did considerable harm to them and drove them back to their camp."

"On 26 September, a Tuesday, the rain was falling in torrential downpours...Khmel sent his emissaries again, begging for mercy and asking that no more blood be shed...and it was decided to make peace", according to Potocki.

Outcome
Potocki listed five reasons for seeking peace including 1) "the auxiliary cavalry troops...quarter-year term was ending", 2) "an epidemic of some sort had developed among the infantry...partly because of hunger...partly because of bad weather...they began to die in large numbers", 3) Janusz Radzwiłł "could not help us long", 4) "predictions of the arrival of the khan himself and his army", 5) hunger befell us and our horses".  The Treaty of Bila Tserkva was signed on 28 September.

References

Bila Tserkva 1651
Bila Tserkva
1651 in Europe